Willy Möhwald (1 September 1908 – 15 May 1975) was a Czech ski jumper. He competed in the individual event at the 1928 Winter Olympics.

References

External links
 

1908 births
1975 deaths
Czech male ski jumpers
Olympic ski jumpers of Czechoslovakia
Ski jumpers at the 1928 Winter Olympics